Revaz Chomakhidze (born December 15, 1973) is a Georgian water polo player who played on the silver medal squad at the 2000 Summer Olympics and the bronze medal squad at the 2004 Summer Olympics.

Career
The well-built player started his water polo career in Tbilisi, Georgia (former Soviet Union) at the sportclub "Dinamo", where he was active between the years 1987-1993. His first coach was Vladimir Kutataladze. After studying at the Tbilisi State University of Georgia he joined the diplomatic Academy. Although he got a diploma "Master Sporta" Waterpolo (2002).

Soon the talented player got his first engagement abroad in Italy: first he played by "Rari Nantes Florentia" 1993-1997. After returning to Russia (Dinamo from 1997–2000) he got a special contract, which allowed him to study at the Moscow University in the economic departure.
In 1997 he was the first time a member of the Russian National Squad. 1998 he played at the Goodwill Games.

In 2000 he played again for one of the best clubs in Italy, Pro Recco, in the near of Genua (2000–2001). His engagement at Pro Recco wasn't so successful as it was awaited. So the last station abroad of the Russian Nationalplayer was at Mladost from Zagreb in Croatia where he has been for 3 seasons. Under the coach Ozren Bonačić he won the Croatian Champiosships with Mladost twice. One of his personal high-lights was when he scored the winning goal in the final of the FINA Cup 2002 against Hungary. In Athens 2004, Tchomakhidze made the difference in Russia's bronze medal victory. The right-hander's four goals lifted his team to a 6-5 win over Greece.

Revaz Tchomakhidze decided to go back to Russia and he is still one of the best player in the young team of Sturm 2002 in Tchechow - a little town before the doors of Moscow.

Although he is still a member of the Russian National Squad. When he was asked when he is going to stop his career he said that his wish would be to play until the Olympic Games in China 2008. In an interview with Novaja izvestija he showed himself very selfprowded: "«Не буду скромничать, я – лучший игрок Европы»" (Translation: I shall not be over-modest, I am the best player in Europe).

In February 2007 shocked Tchomakhidze with the message, that he left the Nationalsquad one month before the World Championships in Melbourne, Australia. In an interview he said he feels very tired and needs a break. If he would return to the Russian team was still open.

He was invited for the 2008 Qualification tournament in March, but he again cancelled his participation for the Russian National Squad. With his club Sthurm 2002 Chekhov he gained 2008 the first place in LEN Trophy. It was a big point for the Russian club, because it was the first International triumph for the young team.

Til summer 2009 Revaz played for Chekhov. After his return in his native country Georgia he played in August 2009 on the B-European championship in Lugano and could help with it Georgia  to the qualification. He took over the role of the youth younger generation trainer in the Georgian waterpolo association. His first success was the qualification for the youth European Championship in Stuttgart 2010.

Since 2022 he acts as a head coacuh of Sintez Kazan.

Achievements
 1989: European Youth Championship Istanbul/Turkey, 5. Place
 1997: European Championship Sevilla/Spain, 3. Place
 1998: Goodwill Games
 1999: European Championship Florence/Italy, 6. Place
 2000: Olympic Games Sidney/Australia, Silber Medal
 2001: World Championships Fukuoka/Japan, Bronze Medal
 2002: World Cup Belgrade/Serbia
 2003: Croatian Championship, 1. Place with Mladost Zagreb/Croatia
 2003: Final Four Genova/Italy, 3. Place with Mladost Zagreb
 2003: European Championships, Ljubljana/Slovenia, 4. Place
 2004: Olympic Games Athens/Greece, Bronze Medal
 2004: Scored multiple goals on Omar Amr to eliminate USA from medal contention.
 2005: World Championships Montreal/Canada, 7. Place
 2005: Russian Championship, 1. Place with Sturm 2002 Tschekhov/Russia
 2006: Russian Championship, 1. Place with Sturm 2002 Tschekhov/Russia
 2006: European Championships, Belgrade/Serbia 9. Place
 2007: Russian Championship, 2. Place with Sturm 2002 Tschekhov/Russia
 2008: LEN Trophy 1. Place
 2008: Russian Championship, 2. Place with Sturm 2002 Tschekhov/Russia
 2009: Russian Championship, 1. Place with Sturm 2002 Tschekhov/Russia

See also
 List of Olympic medalists in water polo (men)
 List of World Aquatics Championships medalists in water polo

References

 
 http://www.infosport.ru/xml/t/person.xml?id=799
 https://web.archive.org/web/20051103051513/http://www.sgh-wasserball.de/history/Jugendmeisterschaft%20Europa/Jgd-EM_89.htm
 https://web.archive.org/web/20070927004851/http://www.sovsport.ru/gazeta/default.asp?id=234652
 https://web.archive.org/web/20070928144130/http://www.volgainform.ru/allnews/788224/
 https://web.archive.org/web/20070930181435/http://www.regnum.ru/news/district-abroad/georgia/sport/788224.html

External links
 

1973 births
Living people
Male water polo players from Georgia (country)
Russian people of Georgian descent
Russian male water polo players
Water polo players at the 2000 Summer Olympics
Water polo players at the 2004 Summer Olympics
Olympic water polo players of Russia
Olympic silver medalists for Russia
Olympic bronze medalists for Russia
Olympic medalists in water polo
Medalists at the 2004 Summer Olympics
Sportspeople from Moscow
Medalists at the 2000 Summer Olympics
Competitors at the 1998 Goodwill Games